Fort Nelson Chapter of the Daughters of the American Revolution Chapter House is a historic Daughters of the American Revolution clubhouse located at Portsmouth, Virginia. It was built in 1935, and is a -story, Colonial Revival style frame building.  The building appears much like a 20th-century adaptation of a wood-frame Tidewater House.  It features a central entrance sheltered by a Classical overhang supported by scrolled brackets.

It was listed on the National Register of Historic Places in 2006.

References

Clubhouses on the National Register of Historic Places in Virginia
Buildings and structures completed in 1935
Colonial Revival architecture in Virginia
Buildings and structures in Portsmouth, Virginia
National Register of Historic Places in Portsmouth, Virginia
Daughters of the American Revolution